, a Gato-class submarine, was the first ship of the United States Navy to be named for the gurnard.

Construction and commissioning
Gurnard′s keel was laid down by the Electric Boat Company at Groton, Connecticut, on 2 September 1941. She was launched on 1 June 1942, sponsored by Miss Suzanne Slingluff, and commissioned on 18 September 1942.

Atlantic Patrol
Following shakedown from New London, Connecticut, Gurnard sailed for Rosneath, Scotland, 2 November 1942 and reached that port 13 days later. Her first war patrol, 28 November to 27 December 1942, brought her to the Bay of Biscay where she lay off the Spanish coast awaiting German blockade runners bound for Spanish ports. The patrol was uneventful; no enemy ships were sighted and subsequently Gurnard returned to New London 9 February 1943 for repairs and alterations.

Pacific Patrols

Second, third, and fourth war patrols, May 1943 – January 1944 

After reaching Pearl Harbor 26 May, the submarine got underway 12 June for her second war patrol. She patrolled off Toagel Mlungui Passage and on 29 June saw action for the first time, damaging two Japanese merchantmen and surviving 24 depth charges thrown by an enemy destroyer. Having expended all torpedoes, the submarine returned via Midway Island to Pearl Harbor, arriving 26 July for refit.

Underway again 6 September, she sailed to the South China Sea to begin her third war patrol. A five-ship convoy was sighted near midnight 7 October and Gurnard began stalking, closing at 01:39 on 8 October and sending to the bottom cargo ship Taian Maru and passenger-cargo ship Dainichi Maru west of Luzon. This successful patrol terminated at Pearl Harbor 28 October.

One month later she sailed on her fourth patrol to prowl off the southeast coast of Honshū and soon found good hunting. A convoy was sighted 24 December and at 07:10 Gurnard attacked. Two minutes later cargo ship Seizan Maru No. 2 had broken in two and sunk; she was soon joined by cargo ship Tofuku Maru. Japanese destroyers attacked the submarine with over 80 depth charges without success. After damaging another merchantman on 27 December, Gurnard returned to Pearl Harbor 7 January 1944. From there she was sent Stateside for overhaul.

Fifth, sixth, and seventh war patrols, April – November 1944 

Following overhaul at San Francisco Gurnard departed Pearl Harbor 16 April on her fifth war patrol, bound for the eastern Celebes Sea. On this patrol she chalked up one of the highest single-patrol tonnage scores of the Pacific war, attacking the Take Ichi convoy on 6 May and sinking 6,886-ton cargo ship Tenshinzan Maru, 6,995-ton passenger-cargo vessel Taijima Maru, and 5,824-ton passenger-cargo ship Aden Maru. Nearly a hundred depth charges rained down around her but she eluded the hunters and escaped undamaged. This vital convoy carried 40,000 troops intended to oppose Gen. MacArthur in New Guinea, and the embarked units suffered losses of nearly 50 percent. Gurnard'''s next kill occurred 24 May when several torpedoes sent to the bottom the 10,090-ton tanker Tatekawa Maru. No further opportunities presented themselves; and Gurnard put in at Fremantle, 11 June 1944 with the completion of the patrol.

The submarine stood out on her sixth patrol 8 July for the Banda, Molucca, Celebes, Sulu, and Mindanao Seas. After topping off at Darwin she patrolled off the Peleng Straits and damaged one merchantman before returning to Fremantle 5 September.Gurnard's seventh patrol commenced 9 October after refit. While cruising off Borneo, she detected a five-ship enemy convoy. A successful attack was pressed home 3 November at the end of an 18-hour hunt, and two torpedoes demolished cargo ship Taimei Maru. Gurnard returned to her Australian port 17 November after this victory.

 Eighth and ninth war patrols, December 1944 – May 1945 

Gurnard finished her final patrol at Pearl Harbor 9 May and put in at Mare Island, California, nine days later for a major overhaul. Following a round-trip voyage thence to Pearl Harbor and Midway, she returned to San Francisco 11 September 1945 and decommissioned there 27 November 1945.Gurnard remained in reserve until 1 July 1949 when she reported to the San Francisco Naval Shipyard for activation as an armory for naval reserve submarine training. Towed to Pearl Harbor 27 November to 9 December 1949, the submarine served there until returning under tow to Tacoma, Wash., 18 May 1953 to continue reserve training duties in that port until June 1960. She was then inactivated in preparation for disposal. Her name was stricken from the Navy List 1 May 1961. She was sold for scrapping 26 September 1961 to the National Metal and Steel Corporation, Terminal Island, Los Angeles, California

Awards
  Navy Unit Commendation
  Asiatic-Pacific Campaign Medal with six battle stars for service in World War IIGurnard''′s war patrols numbers two through seven were designated "successful."

Notes

References

NavSource Online: Submarine Photo Archive Gurnard (SS-254) Keel Laying - WW II Service 
NavSource Online: Submarine Photo Archive Gurnard (SS-254) Decommissioning 
NavSource Online: Submarine Photo Archive Gurnard (SS-254) Naval Reserve Training Vessel - Scrapping 

Gato-class submarines
World War II submarines of the United States
Ships built in Groton, Connecticut
1942 ships